Hermann station is an Amtrak train station in Hermann, Missouri, United States. Hermann became a permanent stop on September 28, 1991 when the Mules and Ann Rutledge began stopping there. Trains had previously stopped only during Hermann's annual Maifest and Octoberfest.

A rebuilt station was approved for construction in 2006 and opened on September 12, 2014. The one story depot features a random rubble stone veneer base, walls clad in traditional clapboard siding and a hipped roof. The waiting room is trimmed in bead board wainscoting, and there are also accessible restrooms. Displays trace the area's transportation history, with a focus on the Missouri River, railroads and roadways. Funding for the project came through the Federal Highway Administration's Transportation Enhancements program, the city of Hermann and the Dierberg Educational Foundation, a local non-profit organization that supports projects to preserve the region's cultural heritage.

See also
List of Amtrak stations

References

External links

Hermann Amtrak Station (USA Rail Guide -- Train Web)

Amtrak stations in Missouri
Buildings and structures in Gasconade County, Missouri
Railway stations in the United States opened in 1991